

BMX (supercross) biking
 April 19 – September 28: UCI BMX Supercross World Cup
April 19 & 20 at  Manchester
Men's Elite winner:  Liam Phillips
Women's Elite winner:  Shanaze Reade
May 10 & 11 at  Santiago del Estero
Men's Elite winner:  Connor Fields
Women's Elite winner:  Shanaze Reade
June 15 & 16 at  Papendal
Men's Elite winner:  Jelle van Gorkom
Women's Elite winner:  Mariana Pajón
September 27 & 28 at  Chula Vista
Men's Elite winner:  Sam Willoughby
Women's Elite winner:  Mariana Pajón
 July 24–28: 2013 UCI BMX World Championships in  Auckland
Men's Elite winner:  Liam Phillips
Women's Elite winner:  Caroline Buchanan

Mountain biking
 May 18 – September 22: 2013 UCI Mountain Bike World Cup
 May 18 & 19 at  Albstadt
 Men's Elite winner (eliminator):  Daniel Federspiel
 Men's Elite winner (XCO):  Daniel McConnell
 Women's Elite winner (eliminator):  Alexandra Engen
 Women's Elite winner (XCO):  Eva Lechner
 May 24 – 26 at  Nové Město na Moravě
 Men's Elite winner (eliminator):  Kenta Gallagher
 Men's Elite winner (XCO):  Nino Schurter
 Women's Elite winner (eliminator):  Jenny Rissveds
 Women's Elite winner (XCO):  Tanja Žakelj
 June 8 & 9 at  Fort William, Scotland (downhill event only)
Men's Elite winner (downhill):  Gee Atherton
Women's Elite winner (downhill):  Rachel Atherton
 June 13–16 at  Val di Sole
Men's Elite winner (eliminator):  Daniel Federspiel
Women's Elite winner (eliminator):  Alexandra Engen
Men's Elite winner (XCO):  Nino Schurter
Women's Elite winner (XCO):  Tanja Žakelj
Men's Elite winner (downhill):  Gee Atherton
Women's Elite winner (downhill):  Rachel Atherton
 July 25–28 at  Vallnord
Men's Elite winner (eliminator):  Fabrice Mels
Women's Elite winner (eliminator):  Kathrin Stirnemann
Men's Elite winner (XCO):  Nino Schurter
Women's Elite winner (XCO):  Sabine Spitz
Men's Elite winner (downhill):  Rémi Thirion
Women's Elite winner (downhill):  Rachel Atherton
 August 10 & 11 at  Mont-Sainte-Anne
Men's Elite winner (XCO):  Julien Absalon
Women's Elite winner (XCO):  Kateřina Nash
Men's Elite winner (downhill):  Steve Smith
Women's Elite winner (downhill):  Emmeline Ragot
 September 12–15 at  Hafjell
Men's Elite winner (eliminator):  Simon Gegenheimer
Women's Elite winner (eliminator):  Jenny Rissveds
Men's Elite winner (XCO):  Jaroslav Kulhavý
Women's Elite winner (XCO):  Irina Kalentieva
Men's Elite winner (downhill):  Steve Smith
Women's Elite winner (downhill):  Rachel Atherton
 September 21 & 22 at  Leogang (downhill event only)
Men's Elite winner (downhill):  Steve Smith
Women's Elite winner (downhill):  Emmeline Ragot
 June 28 & 29: 2013 UCI Mountain Bike Marathon World Championships at  Kirchberg
 Men's Elite winner:  Christoph Sauser
 Women's Elite winner:  Gunn-Rita Dahle Flesjaa
 August 26 – September 1: 2013 UCI Mountain Bike & Trials World Championships in  Pietermaritzburg
 Men's Elite winner (eliminator):  Paul Van der Ploeg
 Women's Elite winner (eliminator):  Alexandra Engen
 Men's Elite winner (XCO):  Nino Schurter
 Women's Elite winner (XCO):  Julie Bresset
 Men's Elite winner (downhill):  Greg Minnaar
 Women's Elite Winner (downhill):  Rachel Atherton
 September 21: 2013 UCI Four-Cross World Championships in  Leogang
 Men's Elite winner:  Joose Wichman
 Women's Elite winner:  Caroline Buchanan

Road cycling
One Day Races.
March 17: Milan–San Remo
.
March 31: Tour of Flanders. 100th edition.
. Second title.
April 7: Paris–Roubaix.
. Third title. Second Flanders and Roubaix double after 2010.
April 21: 2013 Liège–Bastogne–Liège.
 .
Grand Tours.
May 4–26: Giro d'Italia
. (first Giro title and second Grand Tour win)
June 29 – July 21: Tour de France. 100th edition.
. (first Tour title and first Grand Tour win)
August 24 – September 15: Vuelta a España.
 (first Vuelta title and first Grand Tour win)
 The 41-year-old Horner becomes the oldest winner of a Grand Tour.
World Championships.
September 21–29: 2013 UCI Road World Championships in  Tuscany
 The  won the gold medal tally.  won the overall medal tally.  and  won the most gold medals (both 2).

Track cycling
 11 October 2012 – 19 January 2013: 2012–2013 UCI Track Cycling World Cup Classics
 Overall winning country: 
 20–24 February: 2013 UCI Track Cycling World Championships in Minsk, Belarus
  won both the gold and overall medals tallies.
 7–11 August: 2013 UCI Juniors Track World Championships in  Glasgow
  won both the gold and overall medal tallies.

References

 
2013 in sports
Cycle sport by year